This is a list of the largest communes in France in terms of the surface area of their municipalities.

Largest communes in France and overseas departments and territories

Source: Institut géographique national

Largest communes in Metropolitan France

 Paris has a surface area of  km².

Smallest communes in France

See also

 World's largest cities

References
  List of cities by surface area

Communes by surface area
Lists of cities by country
Surface area